Lohs was a "wolfpack" of German U-boats that operated from August 1 to September 22, 1942 in World War II. This pack patrolled both sides of the Atlantic Ocean, preying on merchant vessels coming to Europe from the Americas.

U-boats involved
The U-boats that made up Wolfpack Lohs included:

Raiding career
Lohs was responsible for the sinking of eight ships in the Atlantic Ocean.

References
Notes

Wolfpacks of 1942